Fox Hollies is an area of Birmingham, England, situated on the edge of Acocks Green district. It is named after the Fox Hollies Hall estate.

It roughly includes the area around Fox Hollies Road (part of the A4040 Outer Ring Road), stretching from Acocks Green in the north, to Hall Green in the south. A showpiece housing estate was built to the east of Fox Hollies Road in the 1920s, around Fox Hollies Park. There was also a pub called the Fox Hollies at the junction of Fox Hollies Road and Olton Boulevard East, but this closed in 1997 and has since been demolished to make way for a supermarket.

Until 2004, one of the Birmingham City Council wards was named Fox Hollies. This area is now divided between the Acocks Green and Springfield wards.

The area is served by Spring Road railway station on the Birmingham to Stratford Line, and by several bus routes including the 11A/11C Outer Circle.

References

Areas of Birmingham, West Midlands